Borca can refer to:
Borča, a suburb of Belgrade, Serbia
Borca, Neamț, a commune in Neamţ County, Romania